Striadorbis is a genus of minute freshwater snails that have an operculum, aquatic gastropod molluscs or micromolluscs in the family Glacidorbidae.

Species
Species within the genus Striadorbis include:
 Striadorbis janetae
 Striadorbis pedderi
 Striadorbis spiralis

Distribution
Species in this genus are found in Tasmania and western Victoria, as per Ponder & Avern, 2000.

References

 Nomenclator Zoologicus info
 Zipcode zoo info

External links
 PDF of paper on the family, including the three species now placed in this rather new genus

Glacidorbidae